Ed Collins may refer to:

Ed Collins (American football) player, see Indianapolis Colts draft history
Ed Collins (rugby league), see Bulimba Cup
Ed Collins (musician), see Karl Logan

See also
Eddie Collins (disambiguation)
Edward Collins (disambiguation)
Edmund Collins (disambiguation)
Edwyn Collins, Scottish musician